The 52nd Place Historic District is a historic district consisting of American Craftsman style homes in the Central-Alameda neighborhood of the South Los Angeles, California. African Americans became the dominant demographic group in the district beginning around 1930 with important African-American people living here. The district includes 37 contributing buildings and seven non-contributing buildings.  The contributing buildings are one-story Craftsman houses designed and built by Tifal Brothers between 1911 and 1914.  The characteristic feature of the contributing buildings include "low-pitched gabled roofs with overhanging eaves and exposed rafter tails, front porches and chimneys made of brick or river rock, and multi-paned wood-framed casement windows." The district is located on 52nd Place between McKinley Avenue on the east and Avalon Boulevard on the west and lies just east of the South Park neighborhood.

The district was listed on the National Register of Historic Places in 2009 pursuant to the registration requirements for residential districts set forth in a multiple property submission study, the African Americans in Los Angeles MPS.  The district was originally an all-white neighborhood.  Its period of significance begins in 1930 as African Americans moved into and became the dominant demographic group in the district. The historic significance of the district is enhanced by its association with important African-American figures who lived in the district during its period of significance. Singer Ivie Anderson lived at 724 E. 52nd Place from 1930 until 1945.  Anderson performed with Duke Ellington's band from 1931 to 1942 and recorded the vocals on several hit recordings, including "It Don't Mean a Thing (If It Ain't Got That Swing)" (1932), "Stormy Weather" (1933), "Rose of the Rio Grande" (1938) and "I Got It Bad and That Ain't Good" (1941).  Civil rights activists and journalists, Joseph and Charlotta Bass, lived at 697 E. 52nd Place in the 1930s.  Charlotta Bass owned and operated the California Eagle, the largest African-American newspaper on the West Coast, from 1912 to 1951.

Other buildings listed pursuant to the same African Americans in Los Angeles MPS include the Angelus Funeral Home, Lincoln Theater, Second Baptist Church, 28th Street YMCA, Prince Hall Masonic Temple, 27th Street Historic District, and two historic all-black segregated fire stations (Fire Station No. 14 and Fire Station No. 30).

See also

National Register of Historic Places listings in Los Angeles, California
The Stentorians

References

Buildings and structures on the National Register of Historic Places in Los Angeles
South Los Angeles
Historic districts in Los Angeles
Historic districts on the National Register of Historic Places in California